Dream Quest Images, later known as The Secret Lab, was an American visual effects company, co-founded in 1979 by Hoyt Yeatman, Scott Squires, Rocco Gioffre, Fred Iguchi, Tom Hollister and Bob Hollister.

History
After early piecemeal work on Escape from New York, E.T. the Extra-Terrestrial, and One From the Heart, Dream Quest expanded operations and earned back-to-back visual effects Oscars for work on The Abyss and Total Recall.

In 1996, Dream Quest was purchased by The Walt Disney Company. While Disney began development on Dinosaur, they decided to fold Dream Quest into Walt Disney Feature Animation and subsequently renamed it "The Secret Lab" in 1999.

After The Secret Lab did the visuals of the 2000 animated film Dinosaur, a shuttering process begun, started by cancelling the animated film the studio was doing with Walt Disney Feature Animation, Wildlife. The Secret Lab closed its doors in 2001, but it only shut down once its artists finished their work on Reign of Fire and Kangaroo Jack.

Dream Quest selected filmography

See also
 Animation studios owned by The Walt Disney Company

References

Companies based in Simi Valley, California
Special effects companies
Visual effects companies
Best Visual Effects Academy Award winners
Companies established in 1982
Companies disestablished in 2001